Dora Chatterjee was the third Indian woman to graduate from the Woman's Medical College of Pennsylvania and the first woman from Punjab to earn a medical degree. She founded Denny Hospital for Women and Children in Hoshiarpur.

Biography 
Chatterjee, who has been described as a "Hindu Prince’s Daughter", was from Punjab, India.  Her father was Kali Charan Chatterjee, a Christian convert and noted Presbyterian missionary; Her mother Mary Chatterjee was also active in Christian mission work. As a child, she traveled with her parents to an international missions meeting in New York in 1887. 

Chatterjee returned to the US to study medicine at the end of the 19th century. In 1901, she graduated from Woman's Medical College of Pennsylvania in Philadelphia, now Drexel University College of Medicine, making her the third Indian woman to graduate from the school and the first woman from Punjab to earn a medical degree. The school's first  Indian graduate was Anandibai Joshi, who was also the first Indian woman to attend an American medical school. The second was Gurubai Karmarkar. Chatterjee was described as "the chief interest of the graduating class" in newspapers across the US, sometimes sharing that distinction with a Russian graduate, Olga Povitzky. 

Chatterjee returned to India and established the Denny Hospital for Women and Children in Hoshiarpur. She married Rai Sahib Manghat Rai, a civil servant based in the North-West Frontier Province.

References

External links 

 Newspaper clipping, Dora Chatterjee's graduation from the Woman's Medical College of Pennsylvania Public Relations office records

 Letter sent from India to Woman's Medical College reporting Chatterjee's change of address from Legacy Center Archives, Drexel University College of Medicine, Woman's Medical College of Pennsylvania Collection via the South Asian American Digital Archive (SAADA)

Women physicians from India
20th-century women physicians
Drexel University alumni